Quatro  may refer to:

Cuatro (instrument) (or Quatro), a musical instrument
Éramos Quatro, the seventh album of the Brazilian rock band Raimundos
Lego Quatro, a Lego theme designed for very young children
Mike Quatro, musician and independent entertainment executive
Nvidia Quadro, a model of video card by nVidia
Quatro (album), a 1974 album by Suzi Quatro
Quatro (beverage), a soft drink
Quatro Ciàcoe, a monthly periodical in Venetian language, established in 1981
Suzi Quatro (born 1950), major rock star, actor, and radio researcher/presenter
Suzi Quatro (album), Suzi Quatro's 1973 debut album
¡Cuatro!, a documentary by rock band Green Day, promoted as ¡Quatro!
Quatro, the Prince Charming character in the movie Snow White and the Three Stooges

See also 

 
 
Cuatro (disambiguation)
Quattro (disambiguation)
Quarto (disambiguation)
Cuarto (disambiguation)